Spliceosome RNA helicase BAT1 is an enzyme that in humans is encoded by the BAT1 gene.

This gene encodes a member of the DEAD box family of RNA-dependent ATPases that mediate ATP hydrolysis during pre-mRNA splicing. The encoded protein is an essential splicing factor required for association of U2 small nuclear ribonucleoprotein with pre-mRNA, and also plays an important role in mRNA export from the nucleus to the cytoplasm. A cluster of genes, BAT1-BAT5, is localized in the vicinity of the genes for TNF alpha and TNF beta. These genes are all within the human major histocompatibility complex class III region. Mutations in this gene may be associated with rheumatoid arthritis. Alternatively spliced transcript variants encoding the same protein have been described.

References

External links
 
 PDBe-KB provides an overview of all the structure information available in the PDB for Human Spliceosome RNA helicase DDX39B (BAT1)

Further reading